Hanau is an electoral constituency (German: Wahlkreis) represented in the Bundestag. It elects one member via first-past-the-post voting. Under the current constituency numbering system, it is designated as constituency 180. It is located in southern Hesse, comprising the western part of Main-Kinzig-Kreis, including the city of Hanau.

Hanau was created for the inaugural 1949 federal election. Since 2021, it has been represented by Lennard Oehl of the Social Democratic Party (SPD).

Geography
Hanau is located in southern Hesse. As of the 2021 federal election, it comprises the municipalities of Bruchköbel, Erlensee, Großkrotzenburg, Hammersbach, Hanau, Hasselroth, Langenselbold, Maintal, Neuberg, Nidderau, Niederdorfelden, Rodenbach, Ronneburg, and Schöneck from the Main-Kinzig-Kreis district.

History
Hanau was created in 1949. In the 1949 election, it was Hesse constituency 14 in the numbering system. From 1953 through 1976, it was number 139. From 1980 through 1998, it was number 137. In the 2002 and 2005 elections, it was number 181. Since the 2009 election, it has been number 180.

Originally, the constituency comprised the independent city of Hanau and the districts of Landkreis Hanau and Gelnhausen. In the 1980 through 2009 elections, it comprised the municipalities of Bad Orb, Biebergemünd, Bruchköbel, Erlensee, Flörsbachtal, Freigericht, Gelnhausen, Großkrotzenburg, Gründau, Hammersbach, Hanau, Hasselroth, Jossgrund, Langenselbold, Linsengericht, Maintal, Neuberg, Nidderau, Niederdorfelden, Rodenbach, Ronneburg, Schöneck, and the Gutsbezirk Spessart area from the Main-Kinzig-Kreis district. It acquired its current borders in the 2013 election.

Members
The constituency was first represented by Jakob Altmaier of the Social Democratic Party (SPD) from 1949 to 1965. He was succeeded by fellow SPD member Gerhard Flämig, who served from 1965 to 1980. Bernd Reuter of the SPD then served a single term from 1980 to 1983. Richard Bayha of the Christian Democratic Union (CDU) was elected in 1983 and served until 1994, when he was succeeded by party fellow Manfred Kanther for a single term. Bernd Reuter won the constituency for the SPD in 1998 and served one term, followed by Sascha Raabe of the SPD for two terms. Peter Tauber of the CDU won it in 2009 and served a single term. Katja Leikert was elected in 2013 and re-elected in 2017. Lennard Oehl won the constituency for the SPD in 2021.

Election results

2021 election

2017 election

2013 election

2009 election

References

Federal electoral districts in Hesse
1949 establishments in West Germany
Constituencies established in 1949
Main-Kinzig-Kreis